Hello, stylized as hello, was a social networking service founded by Orkut Büyükkökten, the creator of Orkut. The service currently supports access via a mobile app and is available for Android and iOS. It was launched May 1, 2016, as a replacement to Orkut, which was shut down on September 30, 2014. Hello is owned by Hello Network.

As at September 2019, Hello had been downloaded approximately 1 million times, compared to Orkut's 300 million active users. Hello.com has been shut down.

References

American social networking websites
Internet properties established in 2016